States and Territories may refer to:
 States and territories of Australia
 Provinces and territories of Canada
 States and union territories of India
 Political divisions of Mexico
 States and territories of the United States